Gloria Nansubuga (born November 12, 2001) is a Ugandan Chess player who became the youngest chess player in Ugandan history to be awarded a chess title of Woman FIDE Master by the year 2018.

Background and education 
Nansubuga was born to Lydia and Wilson Kasende, in Kampala's Katwe slum, made famous by Phiona Mutesi and whose life is immortalized by the film Queen of Katwe co-starring Oscar winner Lupita Nyong'o.

She studied from Namirembe Infant Nursery and Primary, then St.Mbuga Vocational Secondary school in Makindye for her secondary level.

She started playing chess at the age of four years, under the guidance of her coach Richard Kakande who also doubled as her chess teacher at St Mbuga Vocational school.

She later joined the Sports Outreach Ministry (SOM) Chess Academy and Mentoring Center in Kampala.

Career 
At the age of 13, Nansubuga won the Best Female Honour at the Rwabushenyi Memorial Chess tournament and was Uganda's leading U-14 player and sixth overall female chess player.

She secured the world chess title at World Chess Olympiad in Batumi, Georgia hence becoming a Woman FIDE master, the third highest rank in the game of chess.

She was awarded the title of Woman Fide Master (WFM) after attaining the minimum requirement of finishing with 6/9 points.She bypassed Woman candidate master (WCM) to become Woman FIDE master, becoming the first Ugandan to make such a leap in the tournament.

Her character was taken up by an actor, the late Nikita Pearl Waligwa in the movie Queen of Katwe as the young girl that taught Phiona Mutesi how to play chess.

See also 

 Uganda Chess Federation
 International Chess Federation
 Woman Fide Master
 Ivy Claire Amoko
 Namaganda Christine

References

External links 
 Gloria Nansubuga rating card at FIDE
 Gloria Nansubuga games at ChessTempo.com
 Gloria Nansubuga games at 365chess.com
 https://www.youtube.com/watch?v=FagdpYLvCwg
 https://twitter.com/vluggya/status/1029449615450492928
 https://entebbenews.net/wanyama-nasubunga-clinch-top-rwabusheyi-memorial-chess-accolades/

2001 births
Living people
Ugandan women
Ugandan female chess players
Chess Woman FIDE Masters